Chateaugay may refer to:

 Chateaugay (village), New York
 Chateaugay (town), New York
 Châteaugay, a commune of the Puy-de-Dôme Départment in France
 Châteauguay, a city southwest of Montreal
 Chateaugay (horse) (1960–1985), American Thoroughbred racehorse
 Chateauguay River, New York

See also
Chateauguay (disambiguation)